Novomykolaivka Raion was one of raions (districts) of Zaporizhzhia Oblast in southern Ukraine. The administrative center of the raion was the urban-type settlement of Novomykolaivka. The raion was abolished on 18 July 2020 as part of the administrative reform of Ukraine, which reduced the number of raions of Zaporizhzhia Oblast to five. The area of Novomykolaivka Raion was merged into Zaporizhzhia Raion. The last estimate of the raion population was

References

Former raions of Zaporizhzhia Oblast
1923 establishments in Ukraine
Ukrainian raions abolished during the 2020 administrative reform